There are multiple consequences of different attachment patterns that are formed in childhood development. This article will explore the way attachment patterns are formed, how parents pass on their attachment styles, long-term consequences of attachment patterns, and cross cultural attachment patterns.

Origins of attachment
The origins of infant attachment can be understood along several different axes: the level of sensitivity in the mother's interactions with her child, the degree to which the mother is rejecting in her interactions with her child, and the level of activity in the mother's interactions with her child. The current body of research on attachment theory suggests that these specific aspects of maternal behavior play a significant role in determining the attachment formed between mother and child, both early in development and generally across time. Measures of these characteristics have predicted the type and degree of the infant-mother attachment formed.

Higher levels of sensitivity in maternal behavior, as defined by the speed at which the mother detects and responds to slight signals or changes in her infant's behavior or environment, are more likely to result in the formation of a secure attachment. Analyses of interactions observed and measured at several stages during an extended period of infant development (one month, four months, and nine months) show that at all stages mothers of secure infants are more sensitively responsive than mothers of insecure infants, the lowest levels of sensitivity being observed in mother-infant pairs developing an insecure-resistant attachment specifically. High levels of rejecting behavior, as defined by the degree to which a mother affectionately interacts with her child, are more likely to result in the formation of insecure mother-infant attachments. At all three ages of measurement, highly rejecting mothers are more likely to have insecure-resistant one-year-olds, and the infants of mothers who were highly rejecting at nine months are more likely to display avoidance in Ainsworth's Strange Situation experiment. High levels of activity in maternal interactions with the infant throughout the first year of development are more likely to result in the formation of a secure attachment. Of these factors, maternal sensitivity has been shown to be the most significant in determining the quality of the mother-infant attachment. Mothers who displayed the highest levels of overall sensitivity throughout the first year of development were more likely to have securely attached one-year-olds exhibiting low levels of resistance and avoidance in the Strange Situation.

Intergenerational attachment theory
One's attachment style shows its impacts on different aspects of their life including the attachment style of their children. Intergenerational attachment theory suggests that a mother's representations of earlier attachment may influence the development of her infant's attachment to her. Hypothetically, it is expected that a parent who had a secure attachment will most probably end up having a child with secure attachment. Bowlby was especially interested in intergenerational attachment styles. In the separation he states that individuals that have supportive parents grow up to be stable and self-reliant.

However, research has also shown that the perception of the parent's earlier attachment style is more important than the attachment itself. The ways in which a mother considers her own historical relationship with her primary caregiver is central to the development of her own child's attachment (Ainsworth & Bowlby, 1991; Main, 1990). Research conducted on this subject by Peter Fonagy, Howard Steele and Miriam Steele included a method where parents answered questions about their attachment histories in their early childhood by answering the Adult Attachment Interview. They also stated how those attachment styles influenced their relationship with their own children. Results have shown that autonomous-secure parents gave coherent account of early attachments whereas preoccupied parents emphasized mostly childhood memories that were about conflicts and dismissing parents were generally unable to identify their memories related to their early childhood attachment.

Consequences of childhood attachment patterns
As children grow up, their attachment to their parents continues to evolve and play different roles in their everyday lives. One example of a persistent attachment that changes over the course of an individual's life is the parental bond.

Consequences of attachment in familial role reversals
The most obvious way a parental attachment changes with age is that parents gradually move from being the care provider to their children to the recipient of care from their children. Because of this “role reversal,” parents experience a “gradual, unhappy relinquishment of autonomy.” However, the way adult children carry out their new caregiver role is also affected by the original attachment the parents formed with their children. This original attachment pattern can lead to many different results. For example, adult children who formed secure attachment patterns as children are more likely to provide high-quality and loving care to their elderly parents than individuals with insecure attachments. Furthermore, individuals with insecure attachments are far more likely to abuse their role as caregivers and withhold care in order to manipulate their parents. Also, elderly parents with an insecure-avoidant pattern are less likely to seek care from their children when they are no longer self-sufficient. Insecure-ambivalent elderly parents are more likely to act in an overly clingy way when they require help. The consequence of this behavior is that their children tend to isolate themselves from their parents and do not react to their parents’ needs. These tendencies reveal that patterns of attachment can influence relationships from a very young age all the way to late adulthood.

Attachment patterns in peer relationships
Another far-reaching consequence of attachment patterns is the method in which adults form and maintain romantic relationships. According to Hazan and Shaver, adults respond to distress based on their experience with the way their environment meets their needs. Hazan and Shaver propose that there are three types of attachment: “consistently responsive, inconsistently responsive, or consistently unresponsive.” Anxious or ambivalent attachment patterns are brought about by extremely inconsistent relationships early in childhood. Adults who do not know if their environments will meet their needs often feel the need to compulsively test the levels of commitment from their partners. This can actually be counter-productive, as the relationships of insecure-ambivalent individual frequently fail.

Insecure avoidant attachment patterns are brought about by consistent unresponsiveness from an individual's environment. Individuals with this pattern of attachment frequently struggle with developing secure and authentic relationships in adulthood due to their expectation that their needs will not be met in times of distress. This pattern also leads to tendencies of avoiding intimate relationships through shunning commitments, intense work schedules, and overly pessimistic views of relationships.

Intergenerational transmission of attachment: within and between cultures
While numerous studies conducted in recent decades validate John Bowlby's theory of attachment, many of these studies reflect trends in only one culture. Mary Ainsworth further specified the mechanics of Bowlby's theory, when she developed the concepts of secure and insecure attachments. After seeing the results of how American children react to the Strange Situation experiment, where babies are separated and then reunited with their parents, Ainsworth proposed that secure attachment is the dominant response and that insecure attachments, both avoidant and resistant, are clear minorities. A fourth type of attachment, namely disorganized, has since also been accepted as a possible style, though it is rare. However, subsequent studies have shown that there are differences in the distribution of attachment types across cultures. For instance, German children are more likely to be classified as avoidant than children in the United States. Similarly Japanese and Israeli children are more likely to fall into the resistant category of insecure attachments than their American counterparts are. However, researchers have more recently argued that these intercultural differences are no more diverse than the intracultural differences found in diverse societies, such as the United States.

One argument suggests that “in general, cross-cultural discussions of attachment theory and findings have proposed that there are large cross-cultural differences compared with intracultural differences; however, no empirical studies have addressed this issue.” In one study, researchers Marinus van IJzendoorn and Pieter Kroonenberg combined all the rates of the different types of attachment, which have been found in studies conducted throughout the world, to form the average global distribution of the different types of attachment. They found that the distribution in the United States, which Ainsworth first explored, is representative of the global distribution. However, an individual sample from a particular U.S. community is just as likely to reflect the distribution of a foreign country as it is to represent a typical U.S. sample. This study demonstrates that cross-cultural differences in attachment reflect local customs and not broader differences between countries. In all cultures, secure attachment seems to be preferred, insecure attachments are still present. While the levels of secure attachment may vary in particular cultures, there has not been any data which suggests the universality of attachment theory is invalid.

Since the cross-cultural variance in the transmission of attachment occurs at a local level, the family plays the crucial role in determining what attachment style a child will develop. In general, the more supportive an attachment figure is, the greater the likelihood that the child develops a secure attachment. In addition, “principal attachment figures can function more supportively when they themselves receive the support of others.” In general, the family is the most stable of all social relationships. For children, the family not only provides the primary attachment figure, but also a consistent (for better or worse) depiction of how relationships should develop. When children have grown up, they will utilize the relationship constructs which their family has demonstrated over the years.

References

Sources
 Fraley RC, Spieker SJ. A Taxometric Analysis.” of Strange Situation Behavior Developmental Psychology Vol. 39 (May 2003), pp. 387–404
 Isabella, Russell A. Child Development Vol. 64, No. 2 (Apr., 1993), pp. 605-621
 Shah, P. E., Fonagy, P., & Strathearn, L. (2010). Is Attachment Transmitted Across Generations? The Plot Thickens. Clinical Child Psychology and Psychiatry, 15(3), 329-345
 The Developmental and Evolutionary Psychology of Intergenerational Transmission of Attachment. Belsky, J. Carter, C. S. (Ed); Ahnert, L. (Ed); Grossmann, K. E. (Ed); Hrdy, S. B. (Ed); Lamb, M. E. (Ed); Porges, S. W. (Ed); Sachser, N. (Ed), (2005). Attachment and Bonding: A New Synthesis. pp. 169-198. Cambridge, MA, US: MIT Press, xiv, 493
 Bowlby, J., & Ainsworth, M. (2013). The Origins of Attachment Theory. Attachment Theory: Social, Developmental, and Clinical Perspectives, 45.
 Magai, Carol. "Attachment in Middle and Later Life." Handbook of Attachment: Theory, Research, and Clinical Applications. Ed. Jude Cassidy and Phillip R. Shaver. 2nd ed. New York [etc.]: Guilford, 2008. 532-51. Print.541
 Magai, 541
 Magai, 543
 Hazan, Cindy, and Phillip R. Shaver. "Attachment as an Organizational Framework for Research on Close Relationships." Psychological Inquiry 5.1 (1994): 1-22. Print. 15
 Hazan and Shaver, 15
 Hazan and Shaver, 16
 Grossmann, K., Grossmann, K. E., Spangler, G., Suess, G., & Unzner, L. (1985). Maternal sensitivity and newborns’ orientation responses as related to the quality of attachment in Northern Germany. In I. Bretherton and E. Waters (Eds.), Growing points of attachment theory and research. Monographs of the Society for Research in Child Development, 50(1-2, Serial No. 209), 233-256
 Miyake, K., Chen, S.-J., & Campos, J. J. (1985). Infant temperament, mother's mode of interaction, and attachment in Japan: An interim report. In I. Bretherton and E. Waters (Eds.), Growing points of attachment theory and research. Monographs of the Society for Research in Child Development, 50(1-2, Serial No. 209), 276-297
 Sagi, A., Lamb, M. E., Lewkowicz, K. S., Shoham, R., Dvir, R., & Estes, D. (1985). Security of infant-mother, father, and metapelet attachments among kibbutz-reared Israeli children. In I. Bretherton and E. Waters (Eds.), Growing points of attachment theory and research. Monographs of the Society for Research in Child Development, 50(1-2, Serial No. 209), 257-275
 van Ijzendoorn, M., H. & Kroonenberg, P., M. (1988). Cross-cultural patterns of attachment: A meta-analysis of the strange situation. Child Development, 59 (No. 1), 147
 van Ijzendoorn, M., H. & Kroonenberg, P., M. (1988). Cross-cultural patterns of attachment: A meta-analysis of the strange situation. Child Development, 59 (No. 1), 147-156
 van IJzendoorn, M.H. & Sagi-Schwartz A. (2008). "Cross-Cultural Patterns of Attachment; Universal and Contextual Dimensions". In Cassidy J, Shaver PR. Handbook of Attachment: Theory, Research and Clinical Applications. New York and London: Guilford Press. pp. 880–905
 Bretherton, I. (1985). Attachment theory: retrospect and prospect. Growing points of attachment theory and research. Monographs of the Society for Research in Child Development, 50(1-2, Serial No. 209), 26

Developmental psychology